Nara Lofego Leão (January 19, 1942 – June 7, 1989) was a Brazilian bossa nova and MPB (popular Brazilian music) singer and occasional actress. Her husband was Carlos Diegues, director and writer of Bye Bye Brasil.

Life
Leão was born in Vitória, Espírito Santo.  When she was twelve, her father gave her a guitar since he was worried about her being shy. Her teachers were popular musician and composer Patricio Teixeira and classical guitarist Solon Ayala. As a teenager in the late 1950s, she became friends with a number of singers and composers who took part in Bossa Nova's musical revolution, including Roberto Menescal, Carlos Lyra, Ronaldo Bôscoli, João Gilberto, Vinicius de Moraes, and Antônio Carlos Jobim. In fact, it was in her apartment in her parents' home in Copacabana, Rio de Janeiro, that the new music was born in 1958. By 1963, after singing as an amateur for a few years, she became a professional and toured with Sérgio Mendes.

In the mid-1960s, the institution of military dictatorship in Brazil led her to sing increasingly political lyrics. Her show, Opinião, reflected her political beliefs, and she had largely switched to political music by this point. In 1964 she even spoke against bossa nova as a movement, calling it "alienating." In 1968 she appeared on the album Tropicália: ou Panis et Circenses, performing "Lindonéia."

She later left Brazil for Paris and in the 1970s abandoned music to focus on her family. She returned to music later, and when she discovered in 1979 that she had an inoperable brain tumor, she increased her productivity as much as possible. She died in 1989.

She was known as "the muse of bossa nova."

Nara's sister was Danuza Leão, a model and socialite who was also a newspaper columnist and occasional TV commentator.

Discography
 1997: I love you Solon V. Ayala Jr.
 1989: My Foolish Heart
 1987: Meus Sonhos Dourados
 1986: Garota de Ipanema
 1985: Nara e Menescal - Um Cantinho, Um Violão
 1984: Abraços E Beijinhos e Carinhos Sem Ter Fim... Nara
 1983: Meu Samba Encabulado
 1982: Nasci Para Bailar
 1981: Romance Popular
 1980: Com Açúcar, Com Afeto
 1979: Nara Canta en Castellano
 1978: Debaixo Dos Caracóis Dos Seus Cabelos
 1977: Meus Amigos São Um Barato
 1974: Meu Primeiro Amor
 1971: Dez Anos Depois
 1969: Coisas do Mundo
 1968: Nara Leão
 1967: Vento de Maio
 1967: Nara  1966: Liberdade, Liberdade 1966: Manhã de Liberdade 1966: Nara Pede Passagem 1966: Show Opinião 1965: Cinco na Bossa 1965: O Canto Livre de Nara 1964: Opinião de Nara 1964: Nara

Bibliography
 De Stefano, Gildo, Il popolo del samba, La vicenda e i protagonisti della storia della musica popolare brasiliana, Preface by Chico Buarque de Hollanda, Introduction by Gianni Minà, RAI-ERI, Rome 2005, 
 De Stefano, Gildo, Saudade Bossa Nova: musiche, contaminazioni e ritmi del Brasile, Preface by Chico Buarque, Introduction by Gianni Minà, Logisma Editore, Firenze 2017,

References

External links
Slipcue.com: Guide to Brazilian music
 
 

1942 births
1989 deaths
20th-century Brazilian women singers
20th-century Brazilian singers
Bossa nova singers
Brazilian columnists
Brazilian mezzo-sopranos
Brazilian people of Azorean descent
Brazilian people of Italian descent
Brazilian people of Portuguese descent
Deaths from brain tumor
Deaths from cancer in Rio de Janeiro (state)
Música Popular Brasileira singers
Brazilian women columnists
Women in Latin music
Wrasse Records artists